Richard Frederick Green is an American astronomer, former director of the Kitt Peak National Observatory, UKIRT and the Large Binocular Telescope Observatory.

Career
He was awarded a bachelor's degree in astronomy by Harvard University in 1971 and a Ph.D. by California Institute of Technology in 1977.

He worked at the National Optical Astronomy Observatory (NOAO) for over 20 years, being promoted deputy director of NOAO in 1992.

He was appointed Director of the Kitt Peak National Observatory in 1997 after which he moved in 2005 to become Director of the Large Binocular Telescope at the Mount Graham International Observatory in southeast Arizona.

He was also an adjunct professor of astronomy at the University of Arizona where he was Director of the University of Arizona/United Kingdom Infrared Telescope Observatory. He was also a member of the Space Telescope Imaging Spectrograph instrument team for the Hubble Space Telescope, the Nuker Team and the NASA Far Ultraviolet Spectroscopic Explorer mission science team.

In 2017 he was appointed Division Director in the Division of Astronomical Sciences, National Science Foundation.

His main research interest is in the area of active galaxies and quasars. He was elected a Legacy Fellow of the American Astronomical Society in 2020.

References 

Year of birth missing (living people)
Living people
California Institute of Technology alumni
20th-century American astronomers
21st-century American astronomers
Fellows of the American Astronomical Society
Fellows of the American Association for the Advancement of Science